Andi Zeqiri (born 22 June 1999) is a Swiss professional footballer who plays as a striker for Swiss Super League club Basel, on loan from Brighton & Hove Albion. He is a Swiss international and has made seven caps at senior level to date.

Club career

Early career and Lausanne
At the age of nine, Zeqiri started playing football for local team Stade Lausanne-Ouchy, where after three years he was transferred to Lausanne, playing with the youth teams in 24 matches and scoring 15 goals. On 22 May 2015, Zeqiri made his professional debut in a 2–1 away defeat against Le Mont, coming on as a substitute in the 71st minute in place of Anđelko Savić.

Loan at Juventus
On 30 August 2016, Zeqiri joined Campionato Primavera 2 side Juventus Youth, on a season-long loan with an option to buy. On 1 October 2016, he made his debut in a 2–0 home win against Sassuolo after coming on as a substitute in the 68th minute in place of Moise Kean.

Return from loan
On 1 July 2017, Zeqiri returned to Swiss Super League side Lausanne. On 12 August 2017, he played the first game after the return in the 2017–18 Swiss Cup first round against NK Pajde Möhlin after coming on as a substitute at 89th minute in place of Gabriel Torres.

Brighton & Hove Albion
On 1 October 2020, Zeqiri signed a four-year contract with Premier League club Brighton & Hove Albion. He made his debut for The Seagulls in a 1–1 home draw against Sheffield United on 20 December coming on as a substitute in the 72nd minute. He made his first start for The Seagulls on 10 January 2021 in a third round FA 
Cup tie away at Newport County where Brighton eventually won on penalties with Zeqiri being replaced in the 63rd minute. Zeqiri came on as a substitute in Brighton's 1–0 away victory over defending champions Liverpool on 3 February claiming their first league win at Anfield since 1982. A few months later, he came on as a substitute in another huge win, Brighton's 3–2 home victory over champions Manchester City on 18 May, with fans returning to football, in which The Seagulls went from 2–0 down to beat The Sky Blues for the first time since 1989.

Zeqiri scored his first Brighton goal in his first game of the 2021–22 season scoring Albions second in the 2–0 EFL Cup second round away win over Cardiff City in what was also his League Cup debut.

FC Augsburg (loan)
On 30 August 2021, it was announced that Zeqiri had signed for Bundesliga side FC Augsburg on loan for the 2021–22 season. He made his debut on 11 September, coming on as a substitute in the 0–0 away draw at Union Berlin. Zeqiri scored his first goal for the club on 2 October, scoring the equaliser in an eventual 2–1 away loss against Borussia Dortmund.

FC Basel (loan)

On 2 August 2022, it was confirmed that Zeqiri had returned to his home country and joined Swiss Super League side FC Basel on a one season loan. He joined Basel's first team for their 2022–23 season under head coach Alexander Frei and made his debut two days later. The game was in the first leg of the third qualifying round of the 2022–23 UEFA Europa Conference League, an away game on 4 August against danish club Brøndby. He scored his first goal for his new club one week later on 11 August, the return leg in the St. Jakob-Park, as Basel won 3–1 on penalties to qualify for the next round. 

Zeqiri played his domestic league debut for the club in the home game on 7 August as Basel played a goalless draw against Young Boys Bern. He scored his first league goal for them in the away game in the Letzigrund on 28 August. In fact he scored two goals as Basel won 4–2 against Zürich.

International career
Youth career with Switzerland
Since 2013, Zeqiri is part of Switzerland at youth international level, respectively part of the U15, U16, U17, U18, U19, U20 and U21 teams and he with these teams played 61 matches and scored 29 goals.

Proposed Kosovo switch

On 17 June 2020, Zeqiri's father confirmed that Zeqiri had obtained the Kosovan passport and will start the process of completing the necessary documents, which would allow him to play for Kosovo immediately after the end of the 2021 UEFA European Under-21 Championship with Switzerland U21s.  On 26 August 2020, Agim Ademi, president of Football Federation of Kosovo, confirmed that Zeqiri was planned to be called up to Kosovo in September 2020 for the 2020–21 UEFA Nations League matches against Moldova and Greece, but due to problems with documentation, could not be part of the team.

European U21 Championships

On 15 March 2021, Zeqiri was named as part of the Switzerland U21's squad for 2021 UEFA European Under-21 Championship. He played in all three of Switzerland's group matches, including playing the whole match of the 1–0 victory over England U21's as they finished third in Group D and not qualifying for the knockouts as a result.

Pledging future with Switzerland 

Euro 2020 call-up

Zeqiri pledged his international career to Switzerland after he was named in Switzerland's 29-man preliminary squad for Euro 2020 on 19 May 2021, this also being his first call-up for the Swiss senior side. The tournament took place in the summer of 2021, postponed from the previous year as a result of Coronavirus. He was an unused substitute in his first match day squad appearance; a 2–1 friendly win at home against the United States on 30 May 2021 in a warm up match for the Euros. A day later he was one of three players cut from the squad for the finals.

He made his national debut on 1 September 2021, coming on as a substitute in the 2–1 friendly victory over Greece at home.

Personal life
Zeqiri was born in Lausanne, Switzerland to Kosovan Albanian parents from the village Talinoc i Muhaxhirëve of Ferizaj.

Career statistics
Club

International

HonoursLausanne'
Swiss Challenge League: 2015–16, 2019–20

References

External links

1999 births
Living people
Sportspeople from Lausanne
Association football forwards
Swiss men's footballers
Switzerland youth international footballers
Switzerland under-21 international footballers
Switzerland international footballers
Swiss expatriate footballers
Swiss expatriate sportspeople in England
Swiss people of Kosovan descent
Swiss people of Albanian descent
Kosovan footballers
Kosovan expatriate footballers
Kosovan expatriate sportspeople in Switzerland
Kosovan expatriate sportspeople in England
Kosovan expatriate sportspeople in Germany
Expatriate footballers in England
Expatriate footballers in Germany
Swiss Challenge League players
Swiss Super League players
FC Lausanne-Sport players
Premier League players
Brighton & Hove Albion F.C. players
Bundesliga players
FC Augsburg players